The NC State Wolfpack is the nickname of the athletic teams representing North Carolina State University. The Wolfpack competes at the National Collegiate Athletic Association (NCAA) Division I (Football Bowl Subdivision (FBS) for college football) as a member of the Atlantic Coast Conference (ACC) for all sports since the 1953–54 season. The athletic teams of the Wolfpack compete in 23 intercollegiate varsity sports. NC State is a founding member of the ACC and has won ten national championships: four NCAA championships, two AIAW championships, and four titles under other sanctioning bodies. Most NC State fans and athletes recognize the rivalry with the North Carolina Tar Heels as their biggest.

The primary logo for NC State athletics is a red block 'S' with an inscribed 'N' and 'C'. The block S has been in use since 1890 but has seen many alterations through the years. The color red was adopted from the state bird, the cardinal. It became the sole logo for all NC State athletic teams in 2000 and was modernized to its current design in 2006.

NC State athletic teams are nicknamed the 'wolfpack'. The name was unofficially adopted in 1921 following an unsigned letter to the NC State Alumni News suggesting the moniker "Wolf Pack".  Prior to the adoption of the current nickname, North Carolina State athletic teams went by such names as the Aggies, the Techs, the Red Terrors, and Farmers.

Sports sponsored

Baseball 

Head Coach: Elliott Avent
Stadium: Doak Field
ACC Championships: 5 (1968, 1973, 1974, 1975, 1992)
CWS appearances: 3 (1968, 2013, 2021)

Men's basketball 

Head Coach: Kevin Keatts
Arena: PNC Arena
National Championships: 2 (1974, 1983)
Southern Conference Championships: 7 (1929, 1947, 1948, 1949, 1950, 1951, 1952)
ACC Championships: 10 (1954, 1955, 1956, 1959, 1965, 1970, 1973, 1974, 1983, 1987)
The above record of conference titles does not include regular season 1st place finishes as championships – the ACC recognizes only the winner of the ACC Tournament as its champion.

Women's basketball 

Head Coach: Wes Moore
Arena: Reynolds Coliseum
ACC Championships (regular season): 6 (1978, 1980, 1983, 1985, 1990, 2022) 
ACC Championships (ACC Tournament): 7 (1980, 1985, 1987, 1991, 2020, 2021, 2022)

Men's cross country 
Head Coach: Rollie Geiger
NCAA Southest Region Championships: 9 (2001, 2002, 2003, 2004, 2006, 2007, 2011, 2016, 2018)
ACC Championships: 16 (1953, 1986, 1991, 1992, 1995, 1996, 1997, 1998, 1999, 2001, 2002, 2003, 2004, 2006, 2009, 2011)

Women's cross country 
Head Coach: Laurie Henes
National Championships (Team): 4 (1979†, 1980†, 2021, 2022)
National Champions (Individual): 6 (1979†, 1980†, 1981, 1983, 1985, 2022)
Julie Shea, 1979
Julie Shea, 1980
Betty Springs, 1981
Betty Springs, 1983
Suzie Tuffey, 1985
Katelyn Tuohy, 2022

NCAA Southest Region Championships: 10 (2000, 2001, 2006, 2007, 2016, 2017, 2018, 2019, 2021, 2022)
ACC Championships: 28 (1978, 1979, 1980, 1983, 1984, 1985, 1987, 1988, 1989, 1990, 1991, 1992, 1993, 1995, 1996, 1997, 1998, 2000, 2001, 2002, 2006, 2016, 2017, 2018, 2019, 2020, 2021, 2022)
The women's cross country team has competed in more NCAA championships than any other school in the nation (25). Additionally the Wolfpack women's cross country team has won more ACC cross country championships (28) than all other schools combined and are the most by an ACC women’s program in any sport.  

†AIAW Women's National Championships

Football 

Head Coach: Dave Doeren
Stadium: Carter–Finley Stadium
ACC Championships: 7 (1957, 1963, 1964, 1965, 1968, 1973, 1979)
Southern Conference Championships: 1 (1927)
South Atlantic Intercollegiate Championships: 3 (1907, 1910, 1913)
Bowl games: 30 (16-13-1)

Golf 
Head Coach: Press McPhaul
Course: Lonnie Poole Golf Course
National Championships (Men's individual): 1 (2009 Matt Hill)
ACC Championships (Men's): 1 (1990)

Gymnastics 
Head Coach: Kim Landrus
Stadium: Reynolds Coliseum
ACC Championships: 1 (1984)
EAGL Championships: 6 (1999, 2000, 2007, 2009, 2013, 2018)

Men's soccer 

Head Coach: George Kiefer
Stadium: Dail Soccer Field
NCAA Tournament Appearances: 16 (1981, 1983, 1984, 1985, 1986, 1987, 1990, 1991, 1992, 1994, 2003, 2005, 2009, 2017, 2018, 2019)
ACC Regular Season Championships: 1 (1994)
ACC Tournament Championships: 1 (1990)

Women's soccer 

Head Coach: Tim Santoro
Stadium: Dail Soccer Field
NCAA Tournament Appearances: 16 (1985, 1986, 1987, 1988, 1989, 1990, 1991, 1992, 1994, 1995, 1996, 2016, 2017, 2018, 2019, 2021)
NCAA Tournament Finalist: 1 (1988)
ACC Regular Season Championships: 1 (1988)
ACC Tournament Championships: 1 (1988)

Softball 

Head Coach: Jennifer Patrick-Swift
Stadium: Curtis & Jacqueline Dail Softball Stadium
ACC Championships: 2 (2006, 2013)

Swimming and diving 
Head Coach: Braden Holloway
Stadium: Willis R. Casey Aquatics Center
National Champions (Individual): 23
ACC Championships (Men's): 32 (1954, 1955, 1956, 1961, 1963, 1966, 1967, 1968, 1969, 1971, 1972, 1973, 1974, 1975, 1976, 1977, 1978, 1979, 1980, 1981, 1982, 1984, 1985, 1992, 2015, 2016, 2017, 2018, 2019, 2020, 2022, 2023)
ACC Championships (Women's): 4 (1979,1980, 2017, 2019)

Men's tennis
Head Coach: Kyle Spencer
Stadium: J. W. Isenhour Tennis Center
ACC Team Championships: 2 (1978, 1979)
ACC Singles Champions: 4 (1978, 1979, 1997, 1998)
ACC Doubles Champions: 5 (1976, 1978, 1980, 1981, 1992)
notable former players: John Sadri, Roberto Bracone

Women's tennis
Head Coach: Simon Earnshaw
Stadium: J. W. Isenhour Tennis Center
NCAA Doubles Champions: 1 (2022 -  Jaeda Daniel/Nell Miller)

Track and field 
Head Coach: Rollie Geiger and Laurie Henes
Stadium: Paul Derr Track & Field Facility
National Champions (Men's Individual): 2
National Champions (Women's Individual): 11 
ACC Championships (Men's): (Indoor - 1988)(Outdoor - 1983, 1984, 1985, 1986, 1987, 1988, 1996)

Volleyball 
Head Coach: Luka Slabe
Stadium: Reynolds Coliseum
ACC Tournament Champions: 1 (1987)

Wrestling 
Head Coach: Pat Popolizio
Stadium: Reynolds Coliseum
National Champions (Individual): 8
NCAA All-Americans: 32
Academic All-Americans: 11
ACC Championships: 20 (1976, 1978, 1981, 1982, 1983, 1988, 1989, 1990, 1991, 1996, 2001, 2002, 2004, 2007, 2016, 2019, 2020, 2021, 2022, 2023)

North Carolina State University's wrestling team was established in 1925 and goes by the team nickname of the "Wolfpack". Pat Popolizio was named head wrestling coach for the Wolfpack on April 10, 2012. Popolizio was a three-time NCAA qualifier at Oklahoma State University. The wrestling team competes at home on campus in the Reynolds Coliseum. 

In 2012, Popolizio left his previous program, Binghamton University, and took all-American heavyweight Nick Gwiazdowski with him. After redshirting for a year (to avoid losing a year of eligibility per NCAA transfer rules), Gwiazdowski won national titles in 2014 and 2015, becoming the first Wolfpack wrestler to win consecutive titles.

During the 2015–16 season, North Carolina State went as high as number two in the national rankings and had the school record for most wins in a single season. The Wolfpack finished tied for fourth at the 2018 NCAA Tournament, sharing a distinction with Virginia Tech in 2016 as the highest tournament finish for an ACC team.

8 individual NCAA Championships: 
(1980) Matt Reiss 167lbs
(1984) Tab Thacker Heavyweight
(1988) Scott Turner 150lbs
(1993) Sylvester Terkay Heavyweight
(2009) Darrion Caldwell 149lbs
(2014, 2015) Nick Gwiazdowski Heavyweight
(2018) Michael Macchiavello 197lbs

Other sports 
NC State also competes in 2 other co-ed varsity sports.

Rifle 10 SEARC Championships 
Cheerleading: NC State fields a full varsity team in cheerleading coached by Harold Trammel, named head cheerleading coach for the Wolfpack in May 2002. The team has won 3 Universal Cheerleading Association national championships, 4 National Cheerleading Association national championships & 2 Universal Cheerleading Association national championships in the Group Stunt competition.

Non-varsity sports
North Carolina State University offers numerous non-varsity and club level sports throughout the year. This includes, but is not limited to; baseball, basketball, cheerleading, crew, hockey, lacrosse, rugby, sailing, soccer, swimming, ultimate frisbee and many others.

The North Carolina State University Men's Rugby Football Club was founded in 1965. NC State plays college rugby in the Atlantic Coast Rugby League against its traditional ACC rivals.  The NC State rugby team is led by head coach Jim Latham. The Wolfpack plays their home games at the Upper Method Road Field. NC State won the Atlantic Coast Invitational 7s tournament in 2010 and 2011. The Wolfpack finished 13th at the 2011 USA Rugby Sevens Collegiate National Championships.  NC State finished 12th at the 2012 Collegiate Rugby Championship, a tournament broadcast live on NBC from PPL Park in Philadelphia. NC State scored a notable upset against #7 ranked Davenport to reach the finals of the 2012 ACI 7s tournament in Blacksburg, only to lose in the final to host Virginia Tech. In 2018, the Wolfpack won the USA Rugby Division II National Championship over Wisconsin-Whitewater and would add the USA Rugby College Sevens National Championship in 2019.

As the university's oldest active sports club, the NC State Sailing Club was founded in 1954, and since 1973 has fielded a competitive intercollegiate co-ed fleet racing team. The program added a women's sailing team in 2013, and an offshore yacht-racing program in 2016. With their home facility at Lake Crabtree County Park, the "SailPack," as the club is known, competes in the South Atlantic Intercollegiate Sailing Association, a division of the Intercollegiate Sailing Association (ICSA). The SailPack has reached the SAISA regional championship consecutively for the past 14 seasons, and as of 2018 is the highest ranking active program in North Carolina ahead of Duke, UNC-Chapel Hill, UNC-Wilmington, Wake Forest, UNC-Charlotte, ECU, and Davidson. Lake Crabtree is also the home venue for NC State's annual Triangle Tango Regatta which features college sailing teams from each active program in North Carolina. Additional dinghy and offshore coastal training activities for the SailPack are located in Oriental, North Carolina where NC State Sailing hosts a major intercollegiate regatta each spring known as the SailPack Oriental Intercollegiate Regatta. The 2018 edition of this event was the largest-ever one-design, collegiate regatta ever held in North Carolina. NC State Sailing, together with the SailPack Foundation, host community sailing during the summer and teach sailing and racing skills to the public free of charge.

NC State's ski team is a member of the United States Collegiate Ski and Snowboard Association (USCSA) and competes in races regularly during the winter season.

NC State ultimate frisbee was established in 1978 and currently participates in the USA Ultimate D-1 men's league. The men's team has had 8 national tournament appearances and won the national championships in 1999.

The NC State men's and women's club hockey team participates in the ACCHL. The Wolfpack has been coached by Mike Gazzillo since 2010, and he has been assisted by Geoff Wing since 2015. The team calls the Raleigh Ice Plex home. Each year, the Wolfpack hosts the Stephen Russell Memorial Tournament to kick off the season in memory of a goaltender for the team from 2006 to 2009. In 2018–19, NC State finished with an undefeated regular season capped off with an ACCHL title, regional championship and a Nationals appearance. The men's team won the ACCHL tournament 4 times (2001, 2019, 2020, 2021). The women's team has won the ACCHL tournament 1 time (2021).

NC State also boasts a growing men's lacrosse team, formerly an NCAA Division I program from 1973 to 1982. Under head coach Chris Demarest, the Wolfpack went 11–3 in 2017 and advanced to the SELC Tournament in Johns Creek, Georgia before falling to the Georgia Tech Yellow Jackets, who advanced to the semi-final round of the MCLA D1 national championship.

NC State college bass fishing team won the 2006 and 2012 Collegiate bass fishing series

NC State club sports and intramural championships are covered by PackTV, a division of the Office of Information Technology at the university. PackTV is a student-driven sport channel that is on channel 32.2 on campus as well as streamed online through Apple TV and Roku. Along with intramural championships, club soccer, hockey, lacrosse, and basketball among others, PackTV has also covered varsity-level men's and women's soccer, softball and swimming.

Championships

NCAA team championships

North Carolina State has won 4 NCAA team national championships.

Men's (2)
Basketball (2): 1974, 1983
Women's (2)
Cross Country (2): 2021, 2022

Other national team championships
Women's (2)
Cross Country (2): 1979*, 1980*
* Prior to 1981, the AIAW administered championships in women's cross country. The NCAA held their first women's cross country championship in 1981.
Co-Ed (6)
Cheerleading (6): 1986, 1990, 1991, 2001, 2016, 2018
see also:
ACC NCAA team championships
List of NCAA schools with the most NCAA Division I championships

NCAA individual championships
NC State athletes have won 45 NCAA and 7 AIAW individual championships as of November 18, 2022

Notable alumni

 Nazmi Albadawi, men's soccer (2010–13)
 Debbie Antonelli, women's basketball (1982–86)
 Andy Barkett, baseball (1992–95)
 Brian Bark, baseball (1987–90)
 Aaron Bates, baseball (2005–06)
 Joan Benoit, cross country (1977-1979)
 Simonas Bilis, swimming (2012–16)
 Andrew Brackman, baseball and men's basketball (2005–08)
 Greg Briley, baseball (1986)
 Andre Brown, football (2004–08)
 Chucky Brown, basketball (1985–89)
 Jimmy Brown, baseball (1932)
 Ted Brown, football (1975–78)
 Willie Burden, football (1971–73)
 Tommy Burleson, men's basketball (1972–74)
 Dick Burrus, baseball (1919)
 Darrion Caldwell, wrestling (2006–2011)
 Mike Caldwell, baseball (1968–71)
 Kenny Carr, men's basketball (1975–77)
 Lorenzo Charles, men's basketball (1982–85)
 Bradley Chubb, football (2014–17)
 Tim Clark, men's golf (1996–97)
 Chris Colmer, football (2002–05)
 Chris Corchiani, men's basketball (1988–91)
 Jerricho Cotchery, football (2000–04)
 Bill Cowher, football (1977–79)
 Doug Davis, baseball (1982–84)
 Joe DeBerry, baseball (1917–20)
 Vinny Del Negro, men's basketball (1983–1987)
 Joey Devine, baseball (2003–05)
 Bill Evans, baseball (1915)
 Adam Everett, baseball (1996)
 Brian Frasure, track and field (1992-1996)
 Stu Flythe, baseball (1934–36)
 David Fox, men's swimming & diving (1990–94)
 Roman Gabriel, football (1960–62)
 Mike Glennon, football (2008–12)
 Tom Gugliotta, men's basketball (1989–92)
 Nick Gwiazdowski, wrestling (2012–2016)
 Maggie Haney, gymnastics (1997-2000)
 Jeff Hartsock, baseball (1986–88)
 J.J. Hickson, men's basketball (2007–08)
 Nyheim Hines, football (2015-2017), track and feild (2015-2016)
 Julius Hodge, men's basketball (2001–05)
 Dutch Holland, baseball (1923–25)
 Torry Holt, football (1995–98)
 Charmaine Hooper, women's soccer (1987–90)
 Cullen Jones, men's swimming & diving (2002–06)
 Erik Kramer, football (1985–87)
 Trudi Lacey, women's basketball(1977-1981)
 Johnny Lanning, baseball (1931–32)
 Manny Lawson, football (2002–05)
 Sidney Lowe, men's basketball (1980–83)
 Matt Mangini, baseball (2005–06)
 Pablo Mastroeni, men's soccer (1995–98)
 Joe McIntosh, football (1981–84)
 Nate McMillan, men's basketball (1985–86)
 Jim McNamara, baseball (1984–86)
 Louie Meadows, baseball (1980–82)
 Rodney Monroe, men's basketball (1988–91)
 George Murray, baseball (1918–21)
 Jessica O'Rourke, women's soccer (2004–07)
 Chad Orvella, baseball (2002–03)
 Chink Outen, baseball (1927–28)
 Jeff Pierce, baseball (1990–91)
 Dan Plesac, baseball (1981–83)
 Mike Quick, football (1978–1981)
 Tab Ramos, men's soccer (1984–87)
 Buck Redfern, baseball (1921–24)
 Jim Ritcher, football (1976–1979)
 Philip Rivers, football (2000–04)
 Dave Robertson, baseball (1910–12)
 Koren Robinson, football (1999–2001)
 Carlos Rodon, baseball (2012–14)
 John Sadri, men's tennis (1976–78)
 Ronnie Shavlik, men's basketball (1954–56)
 Dennis Smith Jr., men's basketball (2016–17)
 Tommy Smith, baseball (1972–74)
 Thori Staples, women's soccer (1992–95)
 Andrea Stinson, women's basketball (1987-1991)
 Tim Stoddard, baseball (1972–75)
 Doug Strange, baseball (1983–85)
 Eric Surkamp, baseball (2006)
 Craig Sutherland, men's soccer (2010–11)
 Sylvester Terkay, wrestling (1991–93)
 Tab Thacker, wrestling (1980–1984)
 David Thompson, men's basketball (1973–75)
 Joe Thuney, football (2011-2016)
 Monte Towe, men's basketball (1972–75)
 Trea Turner, baseball (2012–14)
 T. J. Warren, men's basketball (2012–14)
 Spud Webb, men's basketball (1984–85)
 Mario Williams, football (2003–05)
 Adrian Wilson, football (1997–01)
 Russell Wilson, football (2007–10), baseball (2008–10)
 Will Wilson, baseball (2016–19)
 Tracy Woodson, baseball (1982–84)

Eleven NC State athletes have won Olympic medals: Tommy Burleson and Kenny Carr in men's basketball; Joan Benoit in the women's marathon; Lucas Kozeniesky in rifle; and Stephen Rerych, Steve Gregg, Dan Harrigan, Duncan Goodhew, David Fox, Cullen Jones, and Ryan Held in swimming.

NC State Fight Song
The words to the Fight Song were written by Hardy Ray, Class of 1926, and the music was written by Edmund L. Gruber in 1908. It is essentially a sped-up version of "The Caisson Song", or more recently, "The Army Goes Rolling Along."

Red and White Song
The Red and White Song is a popular song sung by fans and played by the band at many NC State athletic events, especially at football and basketball games. It was written by J. Perry Watson, a former Director of Music at NC State, and was introduced in 1961; students first sang the "Red and White" song at the NC State – Maryland game on February 13, 1961.  The song, although very popular, is in fact not the official Fight Song of NC State. The colors mentioned in the song refer to NC State's main athletic colors, while "Caroline", "Devils", and "Deacs" refer to other Tobacco Road team names: North Carolina Tar Heels, Duke Blue Devils, and Wake Forest Demon Deacons.

The NC State Alma Mater
NC State's Alma Mater was written by two students in the early 1920s. Dr. Alvin M. Fountain, a class of '22 alumnus and editor of The Technician, wrote the words, while Bonnie Norris, from the class of 1923, composed the music.

In 2022, N.C. State changed the lyrics from "Where the winds of Dixie softly blow" to "Where the Southern winds so softly blow".

Mascot
Since 1975, the NC State Wolfpack athletic teams have been represented at athletic events by its mascots, Mr. and Mrs. Wuf, who were married on February 28, 1981, by the Demon Deacon at Reynolds Coliseum at halftime of a college basketball game between NC State and Wake Forest. The Demon Deacon presided over the wedding. In print, the "Strutting Wolf" is used and is known by the name "Tuffy." In September 2010, a purebred Tamaskan dog became the new  live mascot, "Tuffy".

See also
 List of college athletic programs in North Carolina
 North Carolina–NC State rivalry
 Textile Bowl
 East Carolina–NC State rivalry

References

External links

 
 Guide to the Don Schmidt Collection of NC State Athletics Memorabilia 1975-2000
 Guide to the Christopher J. J. Thiry Collection of North Carolina State University Sports Cards circa 1970-2006
 Guide to the Dorothy Fritch Film of North Carolina State University Football and Men's Basketball Games 1947-1951
 Guide to the Ralph Clyde Heath Photographs and Newsclipping of North Carolina State College Athletes 1942-1953